RCWP may refer to

 Russian Communist Workers Party
 Roman Catholic Women Priests